These hits topped the Ultratop 50 in the Flemish region of Belgium in 1993.

References

See also
1993 in music

1993 in Belgium
1993 record charts
1993